"April Showers" is a 1921 popular song composed by Louis Silvers with lyrics by B. G. De Sylva.

History 
The song was introduced in the 1921 Broadway musical Bombo, where it was performed by Al Jolson. It became a well-known Jolson standard: the first of his several recordings of the song was on Columbia Records in October 1921. It has also been recorded by many other artists.

Spike Jones and Doodles Weaver produced a parody that began with the lyrics: "When April showers, she never closes the curtain..."

The British comedians Morecambe and Wise performed a skit featuring the song, which involved a light sprinkling of water drizzling on straight man Ernie Wise whenever he sang it, but a bucket of water being thrown over Eric Morecambe whenever he did the same.

Film appearances
1926 A Plantation Act - an early Vitaphone sound-on-disc short film. Sung by Al Jolson
1936 The Singing Kid - sung by Al Jolson
1939 Rose of Washington Square - sung by Al Jolson
1946 The Jolson Story - sung by Al Jolson
1946 Margie - Sung by Jeanne Crain (dubbed by Louanne Hogan) and chorus
1948 April Showers
1949 Always Leave Them Laughing - played at the Canal Street Boys Club and sung by Milton Berle.
1949 Jolson Sings Again - sung by Al Jolson
1956 The Eddy Duchin Story

Recorded versions

Victor Arden
John Arpin
Chris Barber - included in the album Chris Barber Plays - Vol. 2 (1956)
Les Brown and His Band of Renown (1949)
Carol Burnett
Cab Calloway
Steve Conway
Bing Crosby (1956) (Songs I Wish I Had Sung the First Time Around) & (1977) (Seasons)
Ruth Etting
Arthur Fields (1922)
Eddie Fisher (1954)
Judy Garland - Judy (1956)
Eydie Gorme - for her album Love Is a Season (1958)
Ernie Hare (1922)
Charles Harrison (1922)
Ted Heath
Woody Herman
Joni James
Al Jolson
 (1921 Broadway Production)
 Commercial recording October 21, 1921
 (Performed by in 1926's A Plantation Act)
 Commercial recording December 20, 1932 with Guy Lombardo and his Orchestra
 (1936, in the film The Singing Kid)
 Commercial recording August 10, 1945
 (Re-recorded 1946, for the film The Jolson Story)
Teddy Joyce and His Orchestra
Teddi King - All The King's Songs (1959)
Guy Lombardo and His Royal Canadians (vocal: Don Rodney) (1947)
Abe Lyman and his California Orchestra (with vocals by Louis Rapp)
Arthur Prysock
The Original Rabbit Foot Spasm Band
Jimmy Roselli
Frank Sinatra
Mel Tormé
Leslie Uggams
Ian Whitcomb
Paul Whiteman and his orchestra (instrumental) (1922)
Margaret Whiting (1948)
Jackie Wilson
Kai Winding
Isadora's sneakers sing the part of the song in a Sesame Street animation clip
Bugs Bunny (voiced by Mel Blanc) in the Warner Bros. Cartoons animated short Wet Hare
NRBQ

Lyrics
Below are the lyrics of the 1921 version, which is out of copyright.
Verse 1
Life is not a highway strewn with flowers,
Still it holds a goodly share of bliss,
When the sun gives way to April showers,
Here is the point you should never miss.

Verse 2
Though April showers may come your way,
They bring the flowers that bloom in May,
So if it's raining have no regrets,
Because it isn't raining rain you know, it's raining violets.

Chorus
And where you see clouds upon the hills,
You soon will see crowds of daffodils,
So keep on looking for a bluebird,
And list'ning for his song,
Whenever April showers come along.

References

External links 
Melody with chords & lyrics
Song lyric

Songs about weather
1921 songs
Songs from musicals
Songs with lyrics by Buddy DeSylva
Al Jolson songs
Judy Garland songs
Guy Lombardo songs
Songs with music by Louis Silvers